Hans Heinrich (1911–2003) was a German film editor, screenwriter and film director.

Selected filmography

Director
 The Last Year (1951)
 Knall and Fall as Detectives (1952)
 Love's Awakening (1953)
 Old Barge, Young Love (1957)
 My Wife Makes Music (1958)
 For Love and Others (1959)
 The Cry of the Wild Geese (1961)

Editor
 The Three Codonas (1940)
 Philharmonic (1944)
 The Murderers Are Among Us (1946)

References

Bibliography
 Feinstein, Joshua. The Triumph of the Ordinary: Depictions of Daily Life in the East German Cinema, 1949-1989. University of North Carolina Press, 2002.

External links

1911 births
2003 deaths
Mass media people from Berlin